Mughal–Safavid War may refer to:

 Siege of Kandahar (1605–1606)
 Mughal–Safavid War (1622–1623)
 Mughal–Safavid War (1649–1653)